The Mad Genius (1931) is an American pre-Code  drama film produced and distributed by Warner Bros. and directed by Michael Curtiz. The film stars John Barrymore, Marian Marsh, Donald Cook, Charles Butterworth, and in small roles, Boris Karloff and Frankie Darro. The film is based on the play The Idol (1929) by Martin Brown, which opened in Great Neck, Long Island but never opened on Broadway.

Plot
A crippled puppeteer, Ivan Tsarakov (Barrymore), is frustrated that he will never dance ballet.  He adopts a protégé, Fedor Ivanoff (Darro as a child, Cook as an adult), whom he makes into the greatest dancer in the world. Fedor falls in love with a dancer, Nana Carlova (Marsh), but Tsarakov fears that she will ruin Fedor as a dancer. He tries to separate them and ultimately fires Nana from the ballet troupe. Fedor runs away with Nana to Paris, but Tsarakov has blacklisted him, and he cannot get ballet jobs and is reduced to working in a cabaret. Nana begs Tsarakov to give Fedor his job back. Tsarakov agrees, if Nana will leave Fedor and marry another man; she agrees.  Fedor returns embittered; he sees Nana on opening night and realizes that she still loves him; he refuses to dance. Tsarakov threatens to kill him, but the ballet master, under the influence of drugs that Tsarakov has given him, kills Tsarakov. Fedor is reunited with Nana.

In the film Svengali, released earlier the same year, Barrymore played the title character who similarly manipulated the life of a female singer, also played by Marsh.

Cast
 John Barrymore as Vladimar Ivan Tsarakov
 Marian Marsh as Nana Carlova
 Charles Butterworth as Karimsky
 Donald Cook as Fedor Ivanoff
 Luis Alberni as Sergei Bankieff
 Carmel Myers as Sonya Preskoya
 Andre Luguet as Count Robert Renaud
 Frankie Darro as Young Fedor

Production
Warner Bros. was so pleased by the box office returns for Svengali (1931), also starring Barrymore and Marsh, and their first talking feature The Terror (1928), that they rushed The Mad Genius into production, and released it on November 7, 1931.

Box Office
According to Warner Bros., the film earned $278,000 domestically and $122,000 foreign.

Preservation
The film survives complete. It is preserved in the Library of Congress collection.

See also
 Boris Karloff filmography

References

External links
 
 
 
 
 trailer available for free download at Internet Archive

1931 films
1931 horror films
1930s horror drama films
Films about ballet
Films set in 1916
Films set in 1931
Films set in Berlin
Films set in Paris
American black-and-white films
1930s English-language films
American films based on plays
Films directed by Michael Curtiz
Warner Bros. films
American horror drama films
1931 drama films
1930s American films